Songs for Swingin' Lovers! is the tenth album by American singer Frank Sinatra and his fourth for Capitol Records. It was arranged by Nelson Riddle and released in March 1956 on LP and January 1987 on CD. It was the first album ever to top the UK Albums Chart.

Production
This album was arranged by Nelson Riddle, and took a different tack after In the Wee Small Hours (1955), recording existing pop standards in a hipper, jazzier fashion, revealing an overall exuberance in the vein of Songs for Young Lovers and Swing Easy!.

An additional track, "Memories of You", was recorded during the sessions but ultimately left off the album. (As a slow ballad, it was deemed inappropriate on an album of "swinging" uptempo numbers since the album already included the ballad "We'll Be Together Again.") While Sinatra would re-record the song with Axel Stordahl in 1961 for the Point of No Return album, the 1956 recording with Riddle would remain unreleased until its inclusion on The Longines Symphonette album Sinatra Like Never Before (SYS-5637), released in September 1973 as a bonus LP in the 10-album boxed set Sinatra, The Works. The 1956 recording eventually reached a wider audience when released on The Capitol Years compilation in 1990.

The original cover had Sinatra facing away from the young couple, but in 1957 Capitol altered the cover with a new image of Sinatra facing the couple. Most CD releases have retained the new cover.

Legacy

In 2000, the album was inducted into the Grammy Hall of Fame, and ranked number 306 on Rolling Stone magazine's list of the 500 greatest albums of all time in 2003, and 308 in 2012 revised list. Sinatra aficionados often rank it his best or second best album (to In the Wee Small Hours) and many music critics consider it one of the greatest albums of its era.

In 2000 it was voted number 100 in Colin Larkin's All Time Top 1000 Albums.

The LP was the first number one album in the UK. It was knocked off the top after two weeks by Carousel (the 1956 movie's soundtrack).

The album's title predated the term "swinging" in the sense of partner-swapping sex by 8 years, inadvertently creating a pun on top of the original pun (whereby swinging could refer to either the genre of swing as well as the  original innocent meaning of swinging; i.e., to have a good time).

Releases
Songs for Swingin' Lovers! was released in March 1956 on LP and January 1987 on CD.

In February 2014, Mobile Fidelity Sound Lab released a hybrid disc (SACD + CD) of the album. The original 1956 front cover art was re-used for this issue.

Track listing

Complete personnel
 Frank Sinatra – vocals
 Nelson Riddle – arranger, conductor
 John Palladino – engineer

Tracks 1, 4, 10 (And Memories of You):

Conrad Gozzo, Mickey Mangano, Mannie Klein, Harry Edison (tpt); Joe Howard, Milt Bernhart (tbn); Juan Tizol (v-tbn); George Roberts (b-tbn); Willie Schwartz, Harry Klee (alt/clt); Ted Nash, Babe Russin (ten); Mort Friedman (bar); Paul Nero, Alex Beller, Victor Bay, Harold Dicterow, David Frisina, Mischa Russell, Felix Slatkin, Paul Shure, Marshall Sosson, Harry Bluestone (vln); Maxine Johnson, Milton Thomas, Alvin Dinkin (vla); Eleanor Slatkin, Ennio Bolognini, Cy Bernard (vlc); Kathryn Julye (harp); Bill Miller (p); George Van Eps (g); Joe Comfort (b); Alvin Stoller (d); Frank Flynn (perc).

Tracks 2, 9, 13:

Mannie Klein, Harry Edison, Conrad Gozzo, Mickey Mangano (tpt); Jimmy Priddy, Milt Bernhart (tbn); Juan Tizol (v-tbn); George Roberts (b-tbn); Willie Schwartz, Harry Klee (alt/cit); Justin Gordon, James Williamson (ten); Mort Friedman (bar); Felix Slatkin, Paul Shure, Mischa Russell, Paul Nero, Nathan Ross, Alex Murray, Henry Hill, Alex Beller, Walter Edelstein, Victor Bay (vln); Maxine Johnson, Milton Thomas, Alvin Dinkin (vla); Eleanor Slatkin, Edgar Lustgarten, Ennio Bolognini (vlc); Kathryn Julye (harp); Bill Miller (p); George Van Eps (g); Joe Comfort (b); Irving Cottler (d); Clark Yocum, Allan Davies, Charles Schrouder, Lee Gotch (voe [1]).

Tracks 3, 7, 15:

Conrad Gozzo, Mickey Mangano, Harry Edison, Zeke Zarchy (tpt); Jimmy Priddy, Milt Bernhart (tbn); Juan Tizol (v-tbn); George Roberts (b-tbn); Willie Schwartz, Harry Klee (alt/cit); James Williamson, Justin Gordon (ten); Mort Friedman (bar); Paul Nero, Alex Beller, Victor Bay, Harold Dicterow, David Frisina, Mischa Russell, Felix Slatkin, Paul Shure, Nathan Ross, Alex Murray (vln); David Sterkin, Alvin Dinkin, Milton Thomas (vla); Eleanor Slatkin, Ennio Bolognini, Edgar Lustgarten (vlc); Kathryn Julye (harp); Bill Miller (p); George Van Eps (g); Joe Comfort (b); Alvin Stoller (d).

Track 8:

Shorty Sherock, Harry Edison, Johnny Best, Zeke Zarchy (tpt); Dick Noel, Paul Tanner, Jimmy Priddy (tbn); George Roberts (b-tbn); Willie Schwartz, Mahlon Clark, Justin Gordon, Champ Webb, Robert Lawson (sax/wwd); Emo Neufeld, Samuel Cytron, Robert Gross, Alex Murray, Paul Nero, Henry Hill, Mischa Russell, Dan Lube, Victor Bay, Alex Beller (vln); Maxine Johnson, Paul Robyn, David Sterkin (via); Ennio Bolognini, Ray Kramer, Eleanor Slatkin (vlc); Kathryn Julye (harp); Bill Miller (p); George Van Eps (g); Joe Comfort (b); Irving Cottler (d); Frank Flynn (perc).

Tracks 5, 6, 11, 12, 14:

Mannie Klein, Conrad Gazzo, Harry Edison, Mickey Mangano (tpt); Jimmy Priddy, Milt Bernhart (tbn); Juan Tizol (v-tbn); George Roberts (b-tbn); Willie Schwartz, Harry Klee (alt/cit); Justin Gordon, James Williamson (ten); Mort Friedman (bar); David Frisina, Harold Dicterow, Felix Slatkin, Paul Shure, Mischa Russell, Paul Nero, Victor Bay, Alex Beller, Henry Hill, Marshall Sosson (vln); Maxine Johnson, Milton Thomas, Alvin Dinkin (vla); Eleanor Slatkin, Cy Bernard, Ennio Bolognini (vlc); Kathryn Julye (harp); Bill Miller (p); George Van Eps (g); Joe Comfort (b); Irving Cottler (d); Frank Flynn (perc).

Charts

Certifications

References

1956 albums
Frank Sinatra albums
Albums arranged by Nelson Riddle
Albums produced by Voyle Gilmore
Capitol Records albums
Albums conducted by Nelson Riddle
Albums recorded at Capitol Studios
Swing albums